The 1993 European Aquatics Championships were held in Sheffield, United Kingdom from Tuesday 3 August to Sunday 8 August, in the 50 m pool of the Ponds Forge International Sports Centre. The 21st edition of the event was organised by the LEN.

Besides swimming there were titles contested in open water swimming, diving, synchronised swimming (women) and water polo. The open water competition though was held in Slapy, Czech Republic from 28 to 29 August, while the women's water polo tournament was played in Leeds.

The swimming championships resulted in one world and one European record: Károly Güttler improved the world's best time in the qualifying heats of the men's 100 m breaststroke, while Franziska van Almsick bettered the continental's best time in the women's 100 m freestyle. Star swimmer at this meet was Krisztina Egerszegi, winning four gold medals for Hungary.

Medal table

Swimming

Men's events

Women's events

Open water swimming

 Held in Slapy, Czech Republic on 28 and 29 August 1993.

Men's events

Women's events

Diving

Men's events

Women's events

Synchronized swimming

Water polo

Men's team event

Women's team event

External links
Results

Results at TheSports.org (Men)
Results at TheSports.org (Women)

European Aquatics Championships, 1993
European Aquatics Championships
European
LEN European Aquatics Championships
Swim
Sports competitions in Sheffield
1990s in Sheffield
International aquatics competitions hosted by the United Kingdom
August 1993 sports events in the United Kingdom